opened in Yamatokōriyama, Nara Prefecture, Japan, in 1974. Located at the foot of the  within the 26.6 hectare , the Museum collects, preserves, and displays artefacts relating to everyday life in Nara Prefecture from the Edo period to the Shōwa 40s. Among the forty-two thousand objects in the collection are 1,908 relating to forestry in the Yoshino District that have been jointly designated an Important Cultural Property.

See also
 List of Important Tangible Folk Cultural Properties
 Tomimoto Kenkichi Memorial Museum
 Kōriyama Castle
 Minka
 Mingei
 Nara National Museum

References

External links
  Nara Prefectural Museum of Folklore

Museums in Nara Prefecture
Folk art museums and galleries in Japan
Yamatokōriyama
Museums established in 1974
1974 establishments in Japan